The 2004 presidential campaign of Dick Gephardt, former House Minority Leader and member of the U.S. House of Representatives from Missouri, began on January 5, 2003 with the filing of papers with the Federal Election Commission that established an exploratory committee. He formally announced his entry into the race for the Democratic nomination on February 19, 2003 in St. Louis, Missouri. The day after the Iowa caucuses, Gephardt dropped out of the race on January 20, 2004.

Background
Richard Gephardt did not run for re-election as House Minority Leader after the Democrats lost seats in the 2002 midterm Congressional elections. He announced his second run for president on January 5, 2003. His successor as Minority Leader, Nancy Pelosi, endorsed his bid for president. Gephardt was seen by many as too old fashioned and unelectable, with his fundraising efforts behind that of former Vermont Governor Howard Dean and Senators John Kerry, John Edwards, and tied with Joe Lieberman. Furthermore, Gephardt's support of the Iraq War resolution hurt him among liberal activists. Gephardt promoted a form of universal health care, and was supported by a dozen labor unions, but did not have enough support to receive the endorsement of the AFL–CIO.

Decline
Although Gephardt was ahead in the Iowa caucus throughout early 2003, Vermont Governor Howard Dean pulled ahead in the polls by August, his campaign fueled by anti-war activists. The Gephardt campaign was embarrassed by an early August St Louis Post-Dispatch article that revealed that 11 of 33 "Gephardt team leaders" listed on his Iowa campaign's web site were actually supporting other candidates or neutral. The race between Gephardt and Dean became negative. In the final days of the campaign, both Dean and Gephardt faded and finished third and fourth, respectively.

Aftermath
Although he dropped out of the presidential race, Gephardt was mentioned as a possible running mate for John Kerry. On March 7, 2004, New Mexico Governor Bill Richardson, seen as a strong possibility for the position himself, endorsed Gephardt for the Vice Presidency. "I think he's the best candidate," Richardson said of Gephardt in an interview with the Associated Press. "There's a good regional balance with Kerry and Gephardt."

Nevertheless, Kerry announced that he had chosen John Edwards as his running mate on July 6, 2004. (On that same day, the New York Post published an incorrect headline stating that Gephardt had become Kerry's running mate.) Shortly after this false story broke, the headline was compared to the 1948 "Dewey defeats Truman" front page of the Chicago Tribune, which incorrectly reported the presidential election results of that year.  In 2007, it was revealed in the book No Excuses: Concessions of a Serial Campaigner by Bob Shrum, who served as Kerry's campaign adviser in the 2004 United States presidential election, that Kerry wanted to choose Gephardt as his nominee for vice president, but was convinced by Shrum and others to choose Edwards.

References 

Gephardt